Bibijako Dive (Auntie Day) is a religious holiday celebrated by the majority of  Orthodox Christian Romani people and in lesser case Muslim Roma, from the Balkan who live around the world. This celebration is known as Bibijako Djive. The Roma of Muslim creed also celebrate it in the Balkan. Bibi is celebrated as a healer and protector of the family, and above all as a protector of children's health, it is the Roma version of the Hindu Goddess Shashthi. Each place or city has its own special date for celebration, which is explained by the legend of Auntie Bibi, who came to different places and performed healing at different dates. The dates of this Roma religious holiday are mostly related to the days of Easter fasting and are therefore mobile. The presence of a priest is obligatory, although Auntie Bibi is a non-canonized saint.

In different surroundings Bibi (Auntie) is also called Healer Bibi or Bibiyaku. In Romani, "bibi" means aunt, and the diminutive of that word is "bibiori". Aunt Bibi's holiday is listed in the National Register of Intangible cultural heritage of Serbia in 2019.

Bibi is one of the few true Roma Slava, Household deity. In addition to Bibi, every Roma family celebrates its Slava (such as Babo Fingo at Kakava), as well as other religious holidays, such as Easter and Christmas and Bayram (Turkey).

Customs during the celebration in Serbia 
Bibi is celebrated collectively, with all Romani people in Serbia gathering at a holy place - usually a tree or cross, bringing a celebratory cake and food, and in some places, gifts for a Bibia (comb, mirror and children's clothes) hang on to a holy tree. On the Day of celebration, after the service in the Orthodox Church, the Roma go on a procession, carrying the cake and candles and shouting: "To the health of Bibi (Auntie)!" (Romani: Bibijako sostipe!). Everyone who celebrates brings cake and fast dishes to serve guests under their native tree, usually pear or walnut tree. Under the tree, the host of the next glory is determined and the slava cake is handed over. It is celebrated with songs and dance, and children receive packets full of sweets.

Celebration of Bibi in Muslim communities 
Bibi is well known among Muslim Roma communities in the Balkan, as well as in the wider region. Muslim Roma celebrate it for their holiday Djisatedimi.

Ethnographic literature does not provide reliable information on whether Muslim Roma celebrate Bibijako Djive. According to ethnographer Aleksandar Petrović, Muslim Roma in Kruševac (Serbia) had adopted the Bibijako Djive feast from Christian Roma, and they celebrate it on the same day, but at night. Leading up the holy day, they fast for several days and the celebration starts at sundown. Dragoljub Acković, the author of two monographs on Bibi (2004; 2010), also reports that ethnographic literature does not contain information on the celebration of Bibijako Djive by Muslim Roma. However, in the 2010 monograph Acković references information gathered among Muslim Roma from Prizren, Uroševac or Ferizaj (Kosovo) and Belgrade (the capital of Serbia) which indicates that these Muslim Roman communities celebrated Bibijako Djive for the sake of protecting their children from disease, but that the celebration of the Bibi cult lasts an entire month, from 31 January to 1 March.

See also
Romani society and culture

References

Further reading 
 

Christian festivals and holy days
Holidays based on the date of Easter
Folk Christianity
Romani religion